Vũ Thế Vương (born 31 January 1994) is a Vietnamese footballer who is playing for V.League 1 club Nam Định.

Career

Vũ helped Nam Dinh achieve promotion from the Vietnamese third division to the top flight.

He is the shortest player in the Vietnamese top flight at 1. 56m tall and is nicknamed the "Messi of Nam Dinh" after the Argentine international.

References

External links

 Vũ Thế Vương at Soccerway

Vietnamese footballers
Living people
Association football defenders
Association football wingers
Association football midfielders
1994 births
Nam Định F.C. players